Hypochasmia is a monotypic genus of moth in the family Lecithoceridae. It contains the species Hypochasmia cirrhocrena, which is found in southern India.

The wingspan is 12–14 mm. The forewings are fuscous with a narrow irregular yellowish subcostal streak from the base to about two-thirds, tending to form branches posteriorly, but in males sometimes wholly absent. The hindwings are grey, in males with a median fringe of long hairs from the base to two-thirds, directed downwards and reaching a slender irregular pale ochreous subdorsal streak, terminating in an elongate infuscated spot on the fold before pre-flexus.

References

Natural History Museum Lepidoptera genus database

Lecithoceridae
Monotypic moth genera
Moths of Asia